"Survival Car" is the third single by Fountains of Wayne, from their eponymous debut album. It was released in 1997 and charted in the UK at No. 53 on July 26, 1997.

Backing vocals on "Survival Car" were performed by Dominique Durand of Ivy, a band which also featured the song's co-writer Adam Schlesinger.

The two other tracks on the single – "Comedienne" and the demo version of "I Want You Around" – were unavailable on any Fountains of Wayne album until the release of Out-of-State Plates in 2005.

Track listing (CD single)
All tracks composed by Chris Collingwood and Adam Schlesinger:
"Survival Car" – 2:06
"Comedienne" – 3:41
"I Want You Around" [4 track demo] – 2:39

Credits
Chris Collingwood – vocals, guitar, keyboards
Adam Schlesinger – vocals, guitar, keyboards, drums
Danny Weinkauf – bass guitar
Engineered by Gary Maurer
Mixed by Chris Shaw, Eric Tew
Mastered by Greg Calbi
Recorded in January and April 1996 at The Place, New York City
Mixed at Greene Street Recording, New York City
Mastered at Masterdisk, New York City

References

Fountains of Wayne songs
1997 singles
Songs written by Adam Schlesinger
1996 songs
Songs written by Chris Collingwood
Atlantic Records singles